{{DISPLAYTITLE:C28H22O6}}
The molecular formula C28H22O6 (molar mass: 454.47 g/mol, exact mass: 454.141638 u) may refer to :
 Ampelopsin B, a resveratrol oligomer
 Cyphostemmin A, a resveratrol dimer
 Cyphostemmin B, a resveratrol dimer
 Delta-viniferin, a resveratrol dimer
 Epsilon-viniferin, a resveratrol dimer
 Pallidol, a resveratrol dimer
 Quadrangularin A, a resveratrol dimer